Albert Edward Humphreys (March 22, 1902 – June 29, 1962) was an American football coach and college athletics administrator. He was born in Wolcott, Indiana, and attended the University of Illinois. He became employed by Bucknell University in 1937 and served as the school's head football coach for seven years (1937–1942, 1946) and then as its athletic director from 1947 to 1962.

Head coaching record

College

References

External links
 

1902 births
1962 deaths
Bucknell Bison athletic directors
Bucknell Bison football coaches
High school football coaches in New York (state)
University of Illinois Urbana-Champaign alumni
People from White County, Indiana